The 1960 South Carolina United States Senate election was held on November 8, 1960 to select the U.S. Senator from the state of South Carolina.  Popular incumbent Democratic Senator Strom Thurmond easily won the Democratic primary and was unopposed in the general election.

This was Thurmond's last Senate race in which he ran as a Democrat. Four years later, he switched his affiliation to the Republican Party in opposition to the Democrats' support for the Civil Rights Act of 1964. In his next reelection bid for the Senate, he ran as a Republican. , this is also the last time that the Democrats have won South Carolina's Class 2 Senate seat.

Democratic primary

Candidates
Robert Beverly Herbert, Columbia lawyer
Strom Thurmond, incumbent Senator since 1954 and candidate for President in 1948

Campaign
Herbert argued that Thurmond's means of opposing the civil rights legislation in the 1950s was unconstructive and instead if he were in the Senate he would express to the country how the blacks were benefited by white rule. Herbert's campaign was little more than token opposition as Thurmond racked up a huge victory and won another term because he did not have an opponent in the general election.

Results

Election results

|-
| 
| colspan=5 |Democratic hold
|-

See also
List of United States senators from South Carolina
United States Senate elections, 1960
United States House of Representatives elections in South Carolina, 1960

References

South Carolina
1960
1960 South Carolina elections
Single-candidate elections
Strom Thurmond